Deopahar ( Meaning "deo - gods, pahar - hill", "The Hill of the Gods") is an archaeological site located in Numaligarh, Assam, India. It is one of the most noteworthy ancient heritages of Golaghat district in Assam. Numaligarh is prominently known as one of the archaeologically rich places of the state because of the historical remains of the ancient temple and sculptures that were excavated from the top of the Deopahar. The ancient stone temple and sculptures uncovered at this site are fine specimens of ancient art that represent the interconnection between Aryan (Brahmanical) art and local art, thus, providing enough data for the historians to determine the period of time it was created. It is a protected archaeological park and has a site-museum under the Directorate of Archaeology. The construction of the stone temple appears to be incomplete or damaged possibly during the Assam earthquake of 1897.

Location
The Deopahar archaeological site is a tourist destination in Assam. Deopahar, also called Deoparvat, is by the side of the Asean Highway 1(NH39) in Numaligarh, Golaghat district, Assam, India. Deopahar is a part of the Deopani Reserve Forest. The Deopani Reserve Forest covers a total area of 133.45 hectares and is very rich in flora and fauna. The Deopani Reserve Forest area is an Elephant corridor, and is also famous for the False Hemp Tree (Assamese : Bheleu) (Tetrameles nudiflora), which has been accorded a Heritage tree status. Every year, around the months of October to January, migratory wild giant bees follow migratory routes from the foothills of the Himalayas to come to this particular tree in this forest to build very big beehives. The distance of the Deopahar archaeological site is about 5 km from the Numaligarh Refinery, 61.8 km from Kaziranga National Park, 255 km from Guwahati and approximately 5 km (aerial distance) from the Brahmaputra River.

History
The name Deopahar has many prevailing legends about the origin of the name. The Karbi people who lived by the hill called it Deoparbat or Deopahar where the word 'Deo' or 'Dev' refers to Lord Shiva. According to ancient scriptures, the hill homed many gods and goddesses and was well known as 'Haithali parbat'. Inscriptions of the Kamarupi kings were found on an ancient copper plate which suggested it belonged to a place called 'Joyscandavar in Happaka'. Joyscandavar is believed to have originated from the word Jorasandh located in Numaligarh.

Suhunmung Dihingia Raja (1497-1539) alias Swargadeo Swarganarayan built the fort of Numaligarh in this area under the influence of an evil spirit. Legend has it that  Deopahar was named after this evil spirit that appeared on this hill. The intricate architectural style of the Deopahar stone temple is indicative of the fact that it belongs to the period somewhere between 10th and 11th century AD.  The Deopahar temple may have been a temple for Lord Shiva. The Shiva Linga from the Temple was shifted, and the Baba Than, Numaligarh temple, adjacent to Deopahar, was established in the 19th century.As per the Satsari Buranji, there was a burial site (Maidam)  of a Chutia king (Khunta raja) adjacent to Deopahar.

Architecture
An English tea planter named Thomas Guardthei was the first to highlight the significance and complexity of the unique sculpture and architecture of the broken Shiva temple at Deopahar. The stone temple was erected on a monolithic floor. The temple has a big ceiling slab engraved with a large lotus bearing a relief of Vidyadhara holding a scarf and a necklace by both hands. The vast range of sculptured stone blocks were carved out of Precambrian rocks. The stone blocks at the base of the temple were stabilized together with iron hinges which can be clearly seen.

The overall creative style and design of the building blocks strongly reflect influences of the later Gupta era. There are huge door jambs with foliage of drooping petals, encircling creepers with animal and sculptural representations of female door-keepers with coronets and huge perforated Patrakundalas. Other sculptural representation found are of Kirtimukha, Kalamakaras, Fangananm Shiva, Sridhar Rudra, Lakshmi-Narayana, Hara-Gauri Rashlila, Sarpadevata, Pranayam dhyan, Padma Sakra, Ram and Ravana, Sugriva etc. and panels with carvings of figures depicting episodes from the Ramayana, the Mahabharata and the Bhagavata Purana.

The sculptures at Deopahar depict flying Apsara, fascinating poses of Vishnu, different gestures of Dwarpal Shiva, Ganesha, Yama, Surya, image of Sani, dancing images of gods and goddesses on elephants, and male and female dancers. A flying image of 'Apeshwari' or Apsara with three heads is identified as one of the most beautiful sculptures of Deopahar. These pieces of ancient art have are displayed at Numaligarh Shiva Temple and the Assam State Museum at Guwahati. Studying the sculptures, archaeologist G. Bhuyan described them as one of a kind, highlighting the local art of Assam that was developed in the 10th Century.

Photo gallery

Notes

References

External links
 
 http://dainikjanambhumi.co.in/09092018/page5.php 

Archaeological sites in Assam
Golaghat district
Museums in Assam
Indo-Aryan archaeological sites